Bukit Panau is a state constituency in Kelantan, Malaysia, that has been represented in the Kelantan State Legislative Assembly.

History

Representation history

References

Kelantan state constituencies